Daniel Godfrey Chongolo is a Tanzanian politician and current Secretary General of Chama Cha Mapinduzi political party in Tanzania, appointed by Samia Suluhu into office in April 30, 2021.  Before his appointment, he was a civil servant in Kinondoni District as District Commissioner in Dar es Salaam, and also served as a Commissioner in Longido District, Arusha Region.

Education
In 2013, Daniel Chongolo graduated from Open University of Tanzania receiving his bachelor's degree in mass communication; the graduation was also attended by then Zanzibar Minister and party's NEC member Asha Abdullah Juma, who received her master's degree.

Political career
Before his appointment, Chongolo had served in the party as a Director to a Department of Mass communication under the Directory of Ideology and Publicity at CCM party Headquarters in Dodoma.

See also

References

External links
 

Living people
Tanzanian civil servants
Chama Cha Mapinduzi politicians
Open University of Tanzania alumni
Year of birth missing (living people)